Sincere Carry (born September 15, 1999) is an American college basketball player for the Kent State Golden Flashes of the Mid-American Conference (MAC). He previously played for the Duquesne Dukes.

Early life and high school career
Carry grew up in Hermitage, Pennsylvania and became friends with Kevin Bekelja's son Mike. When Bekelja moved to Solon, Ohio, he asked Carry's mother if he could take him with him and become his legal guardian, and she agreed. In sixth grade, Carry was a top player, with a highlight video garnering thousands of views on YouTube. He attended Solon High School, and broke a growth plate in his hand his freshman season, subsequently dealing with bone chips in his knees. Carry averaged 19.4 points per game and helped Solon reach the District title game and finish 18–8. He earned first team All-Ohio Division I Northeast District and second team All-Cleveland Metro honors. As a senior, Carry averaged 23.3 points, eight assists, and seven rebounds per game, leading Solon to a 27–2 record and the Ohio High School Athletics Association Division I state championship game. He was named to the first team all-state and was a finalist for Ohio Mr. Basketball. Carry initially committed to playing college basketball for Division II West Liberty, the only school to offer a scholarship, but ultimately committed to Duquesne after getting a late offer.

College career
In his second career game, Carry scored a season-high 32 points and had eight assists in a 89–88 overtime win against UIC. He averaged 12.1 points, 5.8 assists, 3.6 rebounds and 2.4 steals per game as a freshman. Carry garnered Atlantic 10 All-Rookie Team honors. Coming into his sophomore season, he switched his jersey number to 10 to honor his friend Khalil Hopson, who was killed in May 2019 at the age of 24. As a sophomore, Carry averaged 12.2 points, 5.3 assists and 3.9 rebounds per game. He played in five games as a junior averaging nine points per game, but decided to transfer in January 2021. According to Duquesne coach Keith Dambrot, Carry's decision to leave was not because of playing time issues but rather unhappiness with the program. He ultimately opted to move to Kent State. Carry transformed his playing style from a pass-first point guard to Kent State's primary scoring option, but struggled at times with his shooting. On February 22, 2022, he scored a career-high 42 points in a 93–82 win against Ball State. As a redshirt junior, Carry was named MAC Player of the Year. As a redshirt junior, he averaged 17.9 points, 4.8 assists and 4.5 rebounds per game. On April 7, 2022, Carry declared for the 2022 NBA draft while maintaining his college eligibility. On June 1, 2022, Carry withdrew from the NBA Draft to return to Kent State for his Senior year.

Career statistics

College

|-
| style="text-align:left;"| 2018–19
| style="text-align:left;"| Duquesne
| 28 || 28 || 33.5 || .434 || .315 || .718 || 3.6 || 5.8 || 2.4 || .2 || 12.1
|-
| style="text-align:left;"| 2019–20
| style="text-align:left;"| Duquesne
| 30 || 30 || 35.6 || .411 || .336 || .750 || 3.9 || 5.3 || .9 || .1 || 12.2
|-
| style="text-align:left;"| 2020–21
| style="text-align:left;"| Duquesne
| 5 || 5 || 30.2 || .368 || .333 || .522 || 4.8 || 4.2 || 1.6 || .0 || 9.0
|-
| style="text-align:left;"| 2021–22
| style="text-align:left;"| Kent State
| 34 || 33 || 36.6 || .431 || .353 || .785 || 4.5 || 4.8 || 1.4 || .2 || 17.9
|- class="sortbottom"
| style="text-align:center;" colspan="2"| Career
| 97 || 96 || 35.1 || .424 || .339 || .742 || 4.1 || 5.2 || 1.5 || .2 || 14.0

References

External links
Kent State Golden Flashes bio
Duquesne Dukes bio

1999 births
Living people
American men's basketball players
Basketball players from Pennsylvania
Duquesne Dukes men's basketball players
Kent State Golden Flashes men's basketball players
People from Hermitage, Pennsylvania
Point guards